Accent on Strings was an Australian television series which aired in 1956 on Sydney station TCN-9. A music series, the first episode aired 27 October 1956. It was among several early locally produced series which debuted during the first official week of programming by the station, along with The Johnny O'Connor Show, game show What's My Line, religious series Give Us This Day, children's series Fun Farm, and music series Campfire Favourites, with these series having varying degrees of success.

Accent on Strings proved to be among the less successful of early TCN-9 offerings, running a couple months, and ending at the same time as Campfire Favourites and The Johnny O'Connor Show.

Three of the episodes exist as kinescope recordings at the National Film and Sound Archive. There is very little information about this series available online.

See also

 List of Australian music television shows

References

External links
 

Nine Network original programming
1956 Australian television series debuts
1956 Australian television series endings
Black-and-white Australian television shows
English-language television shows
Australian live television series
Australian music television series